The three-striped ground squirrel (Lariscus insignis) is a species of rodent in the family Sciuridae. It is found in Indonesia, Malaysia, and Thailand.

References

Thorington, R. W. Jr. and R. S. Hoffman. 2005. Family Sciuridae. Pp. 754–818 in Mammal Species of the World a Taxonomic and Geographic Reference. D. E. Wilson and D. M. Reeder eds. Johns Hopkins University Press, Baltimore.

Lariscus
Rodents of Malaysia
Rodents of Indonesia
Rodents of Thailand
Taxonomy articles created by Polbot
Mammals described in 1821